Yikhüm is a Lotha  Naga village located  north of Kohima, the capital of Nagaland, India.

Etymology
Yikhüm was originally known as Khümyanpan meaning ‘place of worship’ or ‘village of worship’ referring to the forefathers who performs various rituals before establishing a village.

The name was later changed to Yikhüm (Yi-khüm) which translates to ‘believe in word’. ‘Oyi’ meaning‘word’ and ‘khüma’ meaning ‘believe or worship’.

History
The history of Yikhüm, according to oral history traces back to the 12th century A.D. Many scholars and writers opined that these people were originally from Manchuria. They migrated crossing Burma, Manipur and finally settled in Yikhüm.

Clans
The people of Yikhüm were originally divided by four sectors and eight clans. Three clans were later excluded from the village—Eni, Ezüng and Kikon. The present five clans are Jüngi, Khanjüng, Kithan, Mürry and Odyüo.

Geography
It is bounded on the west by Sanis, on the north by Wokha, on the east by Englan and on the south by Hümtso and Elümyu.

Demographics
Yikhüm is located in Englan sub-division of Wokha District, Nagaland with total 461 families residing. It has a population of 3174 of which 1571 are males while 1603 are females as per Population Census 2011.

In Yikhüm, the Average Sex Ratio is 1020 which is higher than Nagaland state average of 931.

See also
 Lotha Naga
 Lotha language
 Naga people

References

 
Villages in Wokha district